
Gmina Zduńska Wola is a rural gmina (administrative district) in Zduńska Wola County, Łódź Voivodeship, in central Poland. Its seat is the town of Zduńska Wola, although the town is not part of the territory of the gmina.

The gmina contains part of the protected area called Warta-Widawka Landscape Park.

Villages
Gmina Zduńska Wola contains the villages and settlements of Andrzejów, Annopole Nowe, Annopole Stare, Beniaminów, Biały Ług, Czechy, Dionizów, Gajewniki, Gajewniki-Kolonia, Henryków, Izabelów, Izabelów Mały, Janiszewice, Karolew, Karsznice, Kęszyce, Kłady, Korczew, Krobanów, Krobanówek, Laskowiec, Maciejów, Michałów, Mostki, Nowe Rębieskie, Ochraniew, Ogrodzisko, Opiesin, Ostrówek, Piaski, Polków, Poręby, Pratków, Rębieskie, Rębieskie-Kolonia, Suchoczasy, Tymienice, Wiktorów, Wojsławice, Wólka Wojsławska, Wymysłów, Zamłynie and Zborowskie.

Neighbouring gminas
Gmina Zduńska Wola is bordered by the gminas of Łask, Sędziejowice, Sieradz, Szadek, Warta and Zapolice.

References
Polish official population figures 2006

Zdunska Wola
Zduńska Wola County